A nineteen-part referendum was held in the Northern Mariana Islands on 2 March 1996. Voters were asked whether they approved of constitutional amendments of each chapter, with a separate vote on each. All amendments were rejected.

Background
A 1993 referendum resulted in a vote in favour of electing a Constitutional Council, which was subsequently elected in March 1995. The Council developed amendments to 19 chapters of the constitution.

The referendum was originally scheduled to be on 4 November 1995 alongside general elections. However, it was later postponed to allow voters more time to familiarise themselves with the amendments.

As well as a majority of votes in favour, each amendment also had to receive at least two-thirds of the vote in favour in two of the three Senate constituencies to be approved.

Results
Only two sets of amendments, to chapters 5 and 15, received a majority of votes in favour. However, in both cases the requirement to get a two-thirds majority in two of the three Senate seats was not achieved. The amendments to Chapter 15 were the only changes to receive two-thirds support in any Senate constituency.

References

1996
1996 referendums
1996 in the Northern Mariana Islands
1996